"I Can't Tell a Waltz from a Tango" is a popular song, written by Al Hoffman and Dick Manning and published in 1954. The best-known version in the United States was recorded by Patti Page; the best-known version in the United Kingdom by Alma Cogan, both of which were recorded in 1954. The Pee Wee King Orchestra recorded the song, reviewed as a "right smooth job" in the same month as the Patti Page's charting of the song.

The Page recording was released by Mercury Records as catalog number 70458, with the B-side "The Mama Doll Song." It entered the Billboard chart on October 16, 1954 at number 30, the only week it charted there. In Australia, "I Can't Tell a Waltz from a Tango" afforded Page a number 14 hit.

The recording by Alma Cogan was released in 1954 by HMV as a 78rpm recording (catalog number B10786) and a 45rpm recording (catalog number 7M 271). It reached number 6 on the UK Singles Chart. The B-side was "Christmas Cards". The song was often used in the BBC comedy radio programme, The Goon Show, by Ray Ellington and his quartet.

References

1954 songs
Songs written by Al Hoffman
Songs written by Dick Manning
Songs about classical music
Songs about dancing